Libertyville is a village in Lake County, Illinois, United States, and a northern suburb of Chicago. The 2020 census population was 20,579. It is part of Libertyville Township, which includes the village, neighboring Green Oaks, and portions of Vernon Hills, Mundelein, unincorporated Waukegan and Lake Forest, and part of Knollwood CDP. Libertyville neighbors these communities as well as Gurnee to the north and Grayslake to the northwest. Libertyville is about 40 miles north of the Chicago Loop and is part of the United States Census Bureau's Chicago combined statistical area (CSA).

Geography

The Des Plaines River forms much of the eastern boundary of the village. Other bodies of water include Butler Lake, Liberty Lake, and Lake Minear.

Libertyville's main street is Milwaukee Avenue (Illinois Route 21). The main automobile route to Chicago is via Interstate 94 (the Tri-State Tollway and the Edens Expressway); Chicago's Loop is approximately 45 minutes away. The main Metra rail station sits at the northern edge of downtown off Milwaukee Avenue, and serves the Milwaukee District/North Line running from Union Station in Chicago to Fox Lake.  The same line is served by another Metra station at Prairie Crossing, near the boundary of Libertyville and Grayslake.  The Prairie Crossing station also serves Metra's North Central Line, with service from Union Station to Antioch.

Major streets
  Tri-State Tollway
  Milwaukee Avenue
 Lake Street
  Buckley Road/Peterson Road
  Park Avenue
 Midlothian Road
 Winchester Road
 Butterfield Road
 St. Mary's Road

Surrounding areas

 Gages Lake / Gurnee
 Grayslake    Waukegan
 Mundelein    Green Oaks / Knollwood
 Mundelein    Mettawa
 Vernon Hills

Demographics

2020 census

2000 Census
As of the census of 2000, there were 20,742 people, 7,298 households, and 5,451 families living in the village. The racial makeup of the village was 92% White, 5% Asian and 1% African American. 0.1% was Native American. About 1% each were classified as belonging to other races or to two or more races. 3% of the population were Hispanic or Latino of any race. While still largely homogeneous, ethnic diversity had increased slightly since the 1960 census, when the population was indicated as being 99.9% white.

As of the 2000 census, there were 7,298 households, out of which 40% had children under the age of 18 living with them, 66% were married couples living together, 7% had a female householder with no husband present, and 25% were non-families. 22% of all households were made up of individuals, and 8% had someone living alone who was 65 years of age or older. The average household size was 2.7 and the average family size was 3.2.

28% of the village's population was under the age of 18, 5% from 18 to 24, 27% from 25 to 44, 28% from 45 to 64, and 12% 65 years of age or older. The median age was 39 years. For every 100 females, there were 92.9 males. For every 100 females age 18 and over, there were 86.9 males.

According to a 2007 estimate, the median household income was $106,337, and the median income for a family was $127,474. Males had a median income of $72,320 versus $39,455 for females. The per capita income for the village was $40,426. About 1.9% of families and 3.5% of the population were below the poverty line, including 4.2% of those under age 18 and 4.9% of those age 65 or over.

As of the 2010 US Census, there were 20,315 people living in the village. The racial makeup of the village was 90.10% White, 1.23% African American, 0.16% Native American, 5.73% Asian, 0.04% Pacific Islander, 1.05% from other races, and 1.70% from two or more races. Hispanic or Latino of any race were 4.12% of the population.

History

The land that is now Libertyville was the property of the Illinois River Potawatomi Indians until August 1829, when economic and resource pressures forced the tribe to sell much of their land in northern Illinois to the U.S. government for $12,000 cash, an additional $12,000 in goods, plus an annual delivery of 50 barrels of salt.

Pursuant to the treaty, the Potawatomi left their lands by the mid-1830s, and by 1835 the future Libertyville had its first recorded non-indigenous resident, George Vardin. Said to be  a "well-educated" English immigrant with a wife and a young daughter, Vardin lived in a cabin located where the Cook Park branch of the Cook Memorial Public Library District stands today. Though he apparently moved on to the west that same year, the settlement that grew up around his cabin was initially known as Vardin's Grove.

In 1836, during the celebrations that marked the 60th anniversary of the U.S. Declaration of Independence, the community voted to name itself Independence Grove. 1837 brought the town's first practicing physician, Jesse Foster, followed quickly by its first lawyer, Horace Butler, for whom Butler Lake is named. The professionals needed services, so a post office opened, necessitating a third name change, because another Independence Grove existed elsewhere in the state. On April 16, 1837, the new post office was registered under the name Libertyville.

The town's name changed again two years later to Burlington when it became the county seat of Lake County. When the county seat moved to Little Fort (now Waukegan) in 1841, the name reverted to Libertyville, without further changes.

Libertyville's most prominent building, the Cook Mansion, was built in 1879 by Ansel Brainerd Cook, very close to the spot where Vardin's cabin was built in the 1830s. Cook, a teacher and stonemason, became a prominent Chicago builder and politician, providing flagstones for the city's sidewalks and taking part in rebuilding after the Great Chicago Fire of 1871. The two-story Victorian mansion served as Cook's summer home as well as the center of his horse farm, which provided animals for Chicago's horsecar lines. The building was remodeled in 1921, when it became the town library, gaining a Colonial-style facade with a pillared portico.  The building is now a museum with furnishings of the period and other relevant displays. It is operated by the Libertyville-Mundelein Historical Society.

The community expanded rapidly with a spur of the Milwaukee Road train line (now a Metra commuter line) reaching Libertyville in 1881, resulting in the incorporation of the Village of Libertyville in 1882, with John Locke its first village president.

Libertyville's downtown area was largely destroyed by fire in 1895, and the village board mandated brick to be used for reconstruction, resulting in a village center whose architecture is substantially unified by both period and building material. The National Trust for Historic Preservation, which gave Libertyville a Great American Main Street Award, called the downtown "a place with its own sense of self, where people still stroll the streets on a Saturday night, and where the tailor, the hometown bakery, and the vacuum cleaner repair shop are shoulder to shoulder with gourmet coffee vendors and a microbrewery. If it's Thursday between 7 a.m. and 1 p.m., it's Farmer's Market time (June–October) on Church Street across from Cook Park -- a tradition for more than three decades."

Samuel Insull, founder of Commonwealth Edison, began purchasing land south of Libertyville in 1906. He eventually acquired , a holding that he named Hawthorn-Mellody Farms. He also bought the Chicago & Milwaukee Electric line (later the Chicago, North Shore & Milwaukee), which built a spur from Lake Bluff to Libertyville in 1903. When Insull was ruined by the Great Depression, parts of his estate were bought by prominent Chicagoans Adlai Stevenson and John F. Cuneo. The home Cuneo built is now the Cuneo Museum.

From 1970 until 2013, Libertyville was the resting place of the only European monarch buried on American soil, Peter II of Yugoslavia, who died in exile in Denver. On 22 January 2013, Peter II's remains were removed from his tomb at St. Sava Serbian Orthodox Monastery and sent to Serbia in a ceremony attended by the Serbian Prime Minister Ivica Dačić, Peter's son Alexander with his family, and Serbian Patriarch Irinej. Peter II lay in state in the Royal Chapel in Dedinje before his burial in the Royal Family Mausoleum at Oplenac on May 26, 2013.

Government
Donna Johnson was elected mayor of Libertyville in April 2021. She is the first African-American, and the second woman, to hold the position.

Libertyville is represented by Jennifer Clark on the Lake County Board.

Education

Libertyville District 70

Libertyville has four public elementary schools and one public middle school within village lines, all comprising Libertyville District 70:

Adler Park Elementary School
Butterfield Elementary School
Copeland Manor Elementary School
Rockland Elementary School
Highland Middle School

Hawthorn District 73

Students residing south of Golf Road attend Hawthorn District 73 schools in Vernon Hills.

Oak Grove District 68

Students residing in communities along Buckley Road attend Oak Grove Grade School in neighboring Green Oaks.

Libertyville High School

Libertyville High School, part of Community High School District 128, serves students in Libertyville and other communities in Libertyville Township.

Other
The Roman Catholic St. Joseph Elementary School and St. John's Lutheran School  of the Wisconsin Evangelical Lutheran Synod both provide Pre-K-8 education to residents of Libertyville and the surrounding area. St Sava Monastery is also home to the St. Sava Serbian Orthodox School of Theology.

Economy

Top employers
According to the Village's 2020 Comprehensive Annual Financial Report, as of April 30, 2020 the top employers in the city were:

Library
Libertyville is one of six communities comprising the Cook Memorial Public Library District.  The Cook Park library, located on Cook and Brainerd streets in Libertyville, is one of the District's two library facilities.  The library was originally housed in the Cook Mansion, after resident Ansel B. Cook's wife, Emily, deeded the property to the Village of Libertyville in 1920 for use as a library.  In 1968, a  addition was added, adjacent to the Cook home. By 1984, the library's collection, as well as the population, had doubled in size.  The Evergreen Interim Library opened in 2003 as a temporary facility at the south end of the district, in Vernon Hills. In 2007, the Library Board adopted plans to add an approximately  addition to the Cook Park facility, which was completed in January 2011.

Media
The Libertyville Review, published by Pioneer Press, covers Libertyville. Regional newspapers that occasionally contain coverage of Libertyville include the Chicago Tribune, Daily Herald and Lake County News-Sun.

Transportation
Libertyville has a station on Metra's North Central Line (at Prairie Crossing) and also two stations along Metra's Milwaukee District/North Line which provides service between Fox Lake and Union Station, one of which shares a driveway with the station for the North Central Service.

Drinking water supply
The Libertyville water supply comes from the Central Lake County Joint Action Water Agency (CLCJAWA) located in Lake Bluff. CLCJAWA purifies water from Lake Michigan.

Recreation
Pools: Adler Pool, Riverside Pool
Golf courses: Merit Club
Lakes: Lake Minear, Butler Lake, Independence Grove, Liberty Lake
Parks: Adler, Cook, Sunrise Rotary, Charles Brown, Riverside, Butler Lake, Nicholas-Dowden, Independence Grove, Blueberry Hill, Paul Neal, Greentree, Jo Ann Eckmann, Gilbert Stiles.

Honors
In 2007, Libertyville was named the 52nd best place to live in the U.S. by CNN.  In 2013, CNN Travel named Libertyville as one of America's best small town comebacks and CNN listed Libertyville as one of the best places to live for the rich and single.

Notable people

Music

Sports

See also
Lambs Farm
St. Sava's Serbian Orthodox Seminary and Monastery

References

External links

Village of Libertyville
Historic Libertyville 

 
Chicago metropolitan area
Villages in Lake County, Illinois
Populated places established in 1836
1836 establishments in Illinois